Unai of UNAI may refer to

 Unai (name), a Basque given name
Unai Sahu, a Bania sub-caste people from Uttar Pradesh, India
Unai, Gujarat, a village in Gujarat, India
Unai, Lucknow, a village in Uttar Pradesh, India
Unai Pass a mountain pass in Afghanistan
Sites on the island of Saipan in the U.S. Northern Mariana Islands
Unai Achugao Archaeological Site
Unai Dangkulo Petroglyph Site
Unai Lagua Japanese Defense Pillbox, a Japanese fortification
Unai Obyan Latte Site
Unaí, a municipality in Brazil
Sociedade Esportiva Unaí Itapuã, a Brazilian football club based in Unaí
United Nations Academic Impact (UNAI), a United Nations initiative in higher education